The 1780 New York gubernatorial election was held in April 1780 to elect the Governor of New York and the Lieutenant Governor of New York.

Results
Incumbent Governor George Clinton and incumbent Lieutenant Governor Pierre Van Cortlandt were re-elected unopposed.

See also
New York gubernatorial elections
New York state elections

1780
United States gubernatorial elections in the 1780s
Gubernatorial